Kerrykeel (historically and in census returns Carrowkeel) is a small village in County Donegal, Ireland. It lies between Knockalla Mountain and Ranny Hill and is on the shores of Mulroy Bay.
Kerrykeel is accessible via the R245 and R247 roads which converge in the centre of the village. Kerrykeel is also in close to the tourist area of Portsalon. Portsalon serves as the gateway to the Fanad Peninsula.

Amenities
Amenities include Saint Colmcille primary school, a Garda station, Roman Catholic and Presbyterian churches, a post office, a grocery shop, butchers, and several takeaways and restaurants.

Every Saturday morning the Kerrykeel Country Market takes place. During the summer period Kerrykeel sees an increase of tourists, with some staying at Rockhill Holiday and Adventure Park, or in holiday rental homes in the area.

A 'Tidy Towns' committee was set up with the vision of improving the overall look of the village. This has included the addition of seasonal flower beds, green areas along the roads leading into the village and improvements to the pier and lay-by along the Milford to Kerrykeel road.

In 2013, Kerrykeel was mistakenly named the 'Crime Capital Of Ireland' after a computer glitch at the Central Statistics Office. With a population of just over 400 people, Kerrykeel was said to have an increase in sexual assaults, burglaries and theft. Later the CSO stated that Kerrykeel was mixed up with Kevin Street. The error was later rectified.

Gallery

Notable people
 Billy Gillespie, footballer, born Kerrykeel
 John Kerr, ballad singer

See also
 List of towns and villages in Ireland

References

External links

Towns and villages in County Donegal